March Entertainment is a defunct Canadian producer of digital animated entertainment for television and the World Wide Web. The company's properties include the television series Chilly Beach, Maple Shorts, Yam Roll, and Dex Hamilton.

Founded in 1996 as a producer of web content, March Entertainment's Chilly Beach Flash animation series would be broadcast on CBC Television starting in 2003. The property also yielded two movies, The World is Hot Enough and The Canadian President.

In 2007, the company co-produced the series Dex Hamilton: Alien Entomologist. The company also co-produced G2G, which aired on Australia's Nine Network in September 2008 and is currently airing on Canada's CBC-TV.

In 2009, March produced its first and only 3D CGI animated movie for toymaker Playmobil, entitled The Secret of Pirate Island. The company was in production for a second DVD movie, which has since been scrapped.

March animated season 1 of Mia and Me, an international co-production with Rainbow S.p.A., broadcaster ZDF and Lucky Punch. The show, which mixes live action and CGI animation, was the most requested program at 2010s MIPJunior conference.

The company's head office was in Toronto and it had an animation studio located in Sudbury.

March Entertainment was also responsible for the websites iLaugh and Edge of Toon.

The company went defunct in the early 2010s and was succeeded by Toonrush.

Works

Chilly Beach (2003)
Maple Shorts! (2005)
The Very Good Adventures of Yam Roll in Happy Kingdom (2006)
Uncle Joe's Cartoon Playhouse (2006)
Chilly Beach: The World Is Hot Enough (2008)
G2G: Got to Go! (2008)
Pet Squad (2010)
Chilly Beach: The Canadian President (2008)
Dex Hamilton: Alien Entomologist (2009)
Playmobil: The Secret of Pirate Island (2009)
Mia and Me (2011–12) (season 1 only)

References

External links
 
 Toonrush official website

Canadian animation studios
Television production companies of Canada
Mass media companies established in 1996
Companies based in Toronto
Companies based in Greater Sudbury